Colin Arnold (born 19 August 1957) is an Australian former cricketer. He played one first-class match for Tasmania in 1976/77.

See also
 List of Tasmanian representative cricketers

References

External links
 

1957 births
Living people
Australian cricketers
Tasmania cricketers
Cricketers from Tasmania